Jayden Daniels (born December 18, 2000) is an American football quarterback for the LSU Tigers. Daniels previously played for the Arizona State Sun Devils before transferring to LSU in 2022.

Early years
Daniels was born on December 18, 2000, in San Bernardino, California. He was a 4 star recruit out of Cajon High School in California. He was ranked number two in the nation for dual-threat quarterbacks.

College career

Arizona State
Daniels committed to Arizona State on December 13, 2018. He graduated early from Cajon in order to enroll at Arizona State in January 2019.

2019
As a freshman, Daniels beat out starter Dillon Sterling-Cole in training camp, making him the first starting true freshman quarterback for the Sun Devils.

LSU
In early 2022, Daniels announced he was transferring to Louisiana State University (LSU) to play for the LSU Tigers.

Jayden reinjured his ankle that had been injured during their game against Texas A&M on December 3, 2022, during the SEC Championship Game. He was listed as questionable, but he never returned because Garrett Nussmeier took his place.

Statistics

References

External links
 
 LSU Tigers bio
 Arizona State Sun Devils bio

2000 births
Living people
African-American players of American football
African-American Christians
American Christians
American football quarterbacks
Arizona State Sun Devils football players
LSU Tigers football players
Players of American football from California
Sportspeople from San Bernardino, California
21st-century African-American sportspeople
20th-century African-American sportspeople